IFM Business School is a private business school located in Geneva, Switzerland.

History 
Established in 1971, IFM Business School is an accredited and innovative institution located in the heart of Geneva, Switzerland 
IFM Business School prepares students in the fields of business, management, finance, entrepreneurship.

Academic programs 
IFM Business School offers business education programs taught in English, French or bilingual.

IFM Business School offers undergraduate and graduate programs such as Bachelor and master's degrees in several disciplines, including Business Administration, Management, Finance, International Business, Entrepreneurship & Innovation, International Finance, Business Transformation.

Accreditation status 
Degrees are fully accredited.

 Programs are accredited by IACBE.
 Programs are accredited by ABCSP.
 Both accreditation bodies have been recognized by the Council for Higher Education Accreditation (CHEA). IFM is listed in the database of "Accredited Programs".

Memberships and affiliations 

Association to Advance Collegiate Schools of Business (AACSB),
Swiss Federation of Private Schools.
 SAPIHE Swiss Association of Private Institutions of Higher Education.
 Geneva Association of Private Schools.

Awards and rankings 

It was listed as 81st Best Business School in the World in 2021 by CEOWorld Magazine.

Ranked in the top tier one for the MBA programs - CEO Magazine 2021.

Ranked 4th - CEO Magazine 2021 for the Executive MBA programs - CEO Magazine 2021.

Awarded : Most innovative Business School, in Switzerland in 2018 and 2019 by Global Brands Magazine.

References

External links
 IFM official website

Business schools in Switzerland
Private schools in Switzerland
Companies based in Geneva